"Everything's Gonna Be Alright" is a song by American country music artist David Lee Murphy as a duet with Kenny Chesney. It was released in November 2017 as the lead single to Murphy's 2018 album No Zip Code. The song reached number one on the US Billboard Country Airplay chart, becoming Murphy's first number one since 1995's "Dust on the Bottle". Murphy co-wrote this song with Jimmy Yeary and Chris Stevens.

Content
The song features "reggae rhythms, sing-along choruses and a programmed percussion loop that's more pop than country" with a lyric that "reassures listeners" that "everything's gonna be alright".

Commercial performance
On the US Billboard Hot Country Songs chart dated December 16, 2017, the song entered at number 47, making for Murphy's first appearance on that chart since "Inspiration", which peaked at number 46 in 2004. At this point, the song had also been on the Country Airplay chart for four weeks. In June 2018, the song became Murphy's second number one hit, and his first since "Dust on the Bottle" in 1995. It is also Chesney's twenty-ninth number one hit. As of August 2018, the song has sold over 255,000 copies in the United States.

Charts

Weekly charts

Year-end charts

Certifications

References

2017 songs
2017 singles
David Lee Murphy songs
Kenny Chesney songs
Male vocal duets
Songs written by David Lee Murphy
Songs written by Jimmy Yeary
Song recordings produced by Buddy Cannon
Songs written by Christopher Stevens (musician)